Levonta Taylor (born November 4, 1997) is an American football cornerback for the Michigan Panthers of the United States Football League (USFL). He played college football at Florida State.

High School career
After high school, Taylor was ranked as the number 1 cornerback in the country by 247 sports.

College career
Despite the fact that Taylor was dealing with injuries, he was still able to appear in 12 games for Florida state as a true freshman.  During his sophomore season, in a game against Louisiana-Monroe, Taylor had his first 2 interceptions of his career.

Professional career

Los Angeles Rams
Taylor signed with the Los Angeles Rams as an undrafted free agent on April 25, 2020. He was waived on August 11, 2020.

Saskatchewan Roughriders
Taylor signed with the Saskatchewan Roughriders of the Canadian Football League on April 27, 2022, but was released on June 2.

Michigan Panthers
On January 5, 2023, Taylor signed with the Michigan Panthers of the United States Football League (USFL).

References

External links
Florida State Seminoles bio

1997 births
Living people
Sportspeople from Virginia Beach, Virginia
Players of American football from Virginia
American football defensive backs
Florida State Seminoles football players
Los Angeles Rams players
Saskatchewan Roughriders players
Michigan Panthers (2022) players